Climate change includes both global warming driven by human-induced emissions of greenhouse gases and the resulting large-scale shifts in weather patterns.

Climate change may also refer to:
 Climate variability and change, changes in Earth's climate system resulting in new weather patterns that remain in place for an extended period of time
 Climate Change (album), a 2017 album by Pitbull
 Climate Change: Global Risks, Challenges and Decisions, a 2009 conference in Copenhagen
 Climate Change – The Facts, a 2019 British documentary presented by David Attenborough 
 Climate Change TV, an online broadcaster 
 Climate Change: What Everyone Needs to Know, a 2015 book by Joe Romm

See also
Global warming (disambiguation)